Alpha Monocerotis, Latinised from α Monocerotis, is the Bayer designation for the brightest star in the equatorial constellation of Monoceros. It can be viewed with the naked eye, having an apparent visual magnitude of 3.94. Based upon an annual parallax shift of 22.07 mas as seen from Earth, it is located 148 light-years away from the Sun. The star is moving away from the Sun with a radial velocity of +10.5 km/s.

The stellar classification of  indicates this is an evolved giant star of type G, which means the hydrogen has been depleted at its core and the outer envelope has expanded and cooled. The 'Fe−0.5' notation indicates the spectrum displays a slight underabundance of iron relative to other stars of this temperature. It is a red clump giant, which means it is generating energy through helium fusion at its core. At the age of 1.18 billion years, this yellow-hued star has an estimated two times the mass of the Sun and 10 times the Sun's radius. It is spinning sedately with a rotation period of about 326 days.

References

External links

G-type giants
Horizontal-branch stars
Monoceros (constellation)
Monocerotis, Alpha
Monocerotis, 26
Durchmusterung objects
061935
037447
2970